Artistic Dress was a fashion movement in the second half of the nineteenth century that rejected highly structured and heavily trimmed Victorian trends in favour of beautiful materials and simplicity of design. It arguably developed in Britain in the early 1850s, influenced by artistic circles such as the Pre-Raphaelites, and Dress Reform movements. It subsequently developed into more specific categories such as Aesthetic Dress and Künstlerkleid on the continent.

Artistic dress

Dante Gabriel Rossetti and other members of the Pre-Raphaelite Brotherhood were conscious archaizers, emulating the work of the "old masters" and choosing romantic, medieval subjects. They dressed their models in long flowing gowns loosely inspired by styles of the Middle Ages. These styles were then adopted by the painters' wives and models for everyday dress.  Dresses were loosely fitted and comparatively plain, often with long puffed sleeves; they were made from fabric in muted colors derived from natural dyes, and could be ornamented with embroidery in the art needlework style. Artistic dress was an extreme contrast to the tight corsets, hoop skirts and bustles, bright synthetic aniline dyes, and lavish ornamentation seen in the mainstream fashion of the period.

In the 1860s, artistic dress became popular in intellectual circles and among artists for its natural beauty; it also reinforced their social ideals of quality materials, respect for the work of the hands, and the purity of medieval design.

Aesthetic dress

Aesthetic dress of the 1880s and 1890s carries on many of the external characteristics of Artistic dress (rejection of tightlacing in favour of simplicity of line and emphasis on beautiful fabrics), even though, at its core, Aestheticism rejected the moral and social goals of the Victorian dress reform that was its precursor.  The Aesthetes' belief that the Arts should provide refined sensuous pleasure was a direct rejection of the reverence for simplicity and handwork propounded by William Morris.

Aesthetic dress encompasses a range of modes, from the Japonaise gowns and Kate Greenaway-inspired children's smocks of Liberty & Co. to the velvet jackets and knee breeches of Oscar Wilde's "aesthetic lecturing costume" for his speaking tour of America in 1882. Prominent designers and dressmakers associated with the movement include Ada Nettleship, who designed costumes for Oscar Wilde's wife Constance Lloyd, and Alice Comyns Carr, who was head costume designer for the actress Ellen Terry. Anna Muthesius was a German designer living in London who was annoyed that women were being exploited by clothing industrialists and that to avoid their pronouncements they should decide on their own fabrics and designs. Her 1903 book, Das Eigenkleid der Frau, which incorporated an Art Nouveau binding by Frances MacDonald, is considered an important contribution to the Artistic Dress movement.

Influence on mainstream fashion
From artistic circles, artistic and aesthetic dress spread to fashionable ones. The delicate, lightly corseted tea gowns of the turn of the 20th century echo the lines of late aesthetic dress, and in their turn paved the way for the early Art Deco creations of Paul Poiret.

Gallery

See also
The Souls
Victorian fashion
Victorian dress reform
 Svenska drägtreformföreningen
 National Dress Reform Association
1860s in fashion
1870s in fashion
1880s in fashion
 The Philosophy of Dress, an essay by Oscar Wilde.

Notes

References
 Ashelford, Jane: The Art of Dress: Clothing and Society 1500-1914, Abrams, 1996. 
 Aslin, Elizabeth: The Aesthetic Movement: Prelude to Art Nouveau, 1969,

External links
(http://artisticdress.wordpress.com/about/)
Aesthetic Dress
The Aesthetic Dress Movement at Fashion-Era
Pre-Raphaelite Ideals and Artistic Dress
Reforming Fashion, 1850-1914: Politics, Health, and Art, Ohio State University

19th-century fashion
Victorian fashion
Pre-Raphaelite Brotherhood
History of clothing (Western fashion)